Pierre-Paul Guérin de Tencin (Grenoble, 22 August 1679 – 2 March 1758), French ecclesiastic, was archbishop of Embrun and Lyon, and a cardinal. His sister was Claudine Guérin de Tencin.

Biography
After studying with the Oratorians in his native Grenoble, he entered the Sorbonne, where he became prior in 1702, and obtained the doctorate in 1705. He was then appointed Vicar-General of the diocese of Sens and, in 1721, accompanied Cardinal de Rohan to Rome as his conclavist, to support the candidacy of Cardinal Conti (Innocent XIII), from whom he had obtained a promise to bestow the purple on the French minister Guillaume Dubois. He remained at Rome as French chargé d'affaires, with the appointment in commendam of abbot of Trois-Fontaines to support him (1739–1753), until Benedict XIII, with whom he was on cordial terms of intimacy and very influential, consecrated him Archbishop of Embrun (26 June 1724).

On 22 February 1739, Guérin de Tencin was created cardinal, of the titulus of Sts. Nereus and Achilleus. He remained at Rome as French ambassador until 1742, when he took possession of the archepiscopal see of Lyon, to which he had succeeded on 19 November 1740. Louis XV appointed him minister of state in September 1742, though he held no portfolio, and Commander of the Order of Saint-Esprit.

He was overzealous in the persecution of the Jansenists, and, at the provincial synod which he held at Embrun from 16 August to 28 September 1727, he suspended Jean Soanen, Bishop of Senez, a prelate eighty years of age, who had appealed against the Bull Unigenitus.

After the death in 1743 of André-Hercule Cardinal de Fleury, the prime minister to whom he owed much of his political advancement, his influence began to decrease. The death of Claudine Guérin de Tencin, his salonist sister, in 1749 removed some of his political ambition, and in 1752 he retired to his see of Lyons.

Notes

References

Cardinal of the Holy Roman Church: Pierre Guérin de Tencin

1679 births
1758 deaths
Clergy from Grenoble
University of Paris alumni
18th-century French cardinals
Archbishops of Lyon
Conclavists
18th century in Lyon